Kevin Garrett (born March 25, 1991) is an American musician from Pittsburgh, Pennsylvania based out of Brooklyn, New York. He has released two EPs, as well as a full-length album, and was nominated for a Grammy Award for his work on Beyoncé's album Lemonade.

Early life
Garrett was born on March 25, 1991, in Pittsburgh, Pennsylvania. He was raised in Point Breeze. His first musical experience was playing the violin at a very young age, but he began writing his own songs later in life.

Career
Garrett is signed to Jay-Z's Roc Nation for publishing, and in 2018, he signed a worldwide recording deal with AWAL, Kobalt Music's recording company.

His debut EP, Mellow Drama, was released on April 7, 2015. Garrett co-wrote and co-produced "Pray You Catch Me", the lead track on Beyoncé's 2016 album, Lemonade. He was nominated for a Grammy Award for his work on the album.

In 2017 he released his second EP, False Hope. The release was accompanied by music videos for "Little Bit of You" and "Pulling Me Under", directed by Jean Claude Billmaier, and "Stranglehold" directed by Shervin Lainez.

In October 2018, Garrett released the single "In Case I Don't Feel", from his full-length debut, Hoax, which came out on March 22, 2019.

Performances
Garrett has opened for Mumford & Sons, Alessia Cara, James Vincent McMorrow, X Ambassadors, James Bay, and Oh Wonder. In 2017 he headlined his False Hope tour, with ARIZONA as openers. He has also performed at Bonnaroo, Sasquatch! Music Festival, and the Firefly Music Festival.

Personal life
From 2016 to 2018, Garrett was in a relationship with Canadian singer Alessia Cara. Garrett studied music technology at New York University.

Awards

Discography

Albums

EPs

Singles

as lead artist

as featured artist

Guest appearances

Songwriting and Production Credits

songs written

songs produced

References

External links
 Garrett performing at the Paper Penthouse, March 20, 2017

American pop musicians
Musicians from Pittsburgh
Singer-songwriters from Pennsylvania
1991 births
Living people
New York University alumni
American contemporary R&B singers
American male singer-songwriters
21st-century American singers
21st-century American male singers